Shaukat Hussein Khan Mazari (1948–November 2008) was a prominent figure in the provincial politics of the Punjab, province of Pakistan. He died on 14 November 2008.

He was studied in Sadiq Public School Bahawal Pur. He went to England for Higher Education. He was known as Awam Dost leader. People loved him for his support and kind behaviour. He is the man who supported Dost Muhammad Mazari in his early stages of political journey. Dost Muhammad Mazari got elected MNA by his support. 

He was elected as a Member of Provincial Assembly (MPA) from Rojhan-Mazari three times and has also served in the capacity of a provincial minister for a few days in 1977. Before his death, Mazari was serving as the Deputy Speaker of the Provincial Assembly of the Punjab.

References 

1948 births
2008 deaths
Baloch politicians
Deputy Speakers of the Provincial Assembly of the Punjab
Mazari family